Are We There Yet? is an American television sitcom, which ran on TBS for three seasons from June 2, 2010, to March 1, 2013. Based on the 2005 feature film of the same name, it revolves around a family dealing with normal family situations plus adapting to a new family setup after a divorced mother remarries. Ice Cube, Ali LeRoi, Matt Alvarez, Vince Totino, and Joe Roth served as the show's executive producers.

Premise
The series takes place in a continuity different from that of the films Are We There Yet? and Are We Done Yet?, and centers on the blended Kingston-Persons of Seattle facing the challenges of everyday life in a new blended family. Nick Persons (Terry Crews) and Suzanne Kingston-Persons (Essence Atkins) have been married for 6 months and former athlete Nick has sold his sports-memorabilia shop and taken a job in information technology. He is still trying to figure out his role in the family and bond with Suzanne's two children: Lindsey, who's forever texting on her cell phone, and Kevin, who's usually seen playing video games or playing with his best friend Troy. The kids' father is Suzanne's ex-husband Frank Kingston, who has a new wife and son. Suzanne herself has a very hectic schedule as a party planner. Nick's mother (Telma Hopkins) is not happy about her son's recent marriage or her new role as a grandmother and has a hard time getting along with her new daughter-in-law. The series draws its humor from everyday family situations. Though sharing the title and characters from the original film, the story is more similar to the storyline of its sequel, Are We Done Yet? as opposed to Are We There Yet?.

Episodes

Cast

Main
 Terry Crews replaces Ice Cube as Nick Kingston-Persons, Suzanne's husband and Lindsey and Kevin's stepfather. New to marriage and fatherhood, Nick is an ex-athlete who works in TV sports commentary. The only child of an eccentric mother, he possesses solid family values and a strong work ethic. Nick used to own a sports-memorabilia store, but he recently sold the business to his best friend Martin and got a job as a sports reporter at KAWT. Nick later becomes a part-owner in Martin's sports-themed bar/restaurant called Martin.
 Essence Atkins replaces Nia Long as Suzanne Kingston-Persons, Nick's wife, Lindsey and Kevin's mother, and Terrence's sister. Suzanne is a modern woman with a career and love for her family. As a newlywed mother of two, she's trying to juggle family and career, while also trying to have a little fun. Suzanne is a successful event planner, known for her creative edge and attention to detail. She also has a childish wit.
 Coy Stewart replaces Philip Daniel Bolden as Kevin Kingston-Persons, Suzanne's son, Nick's stepson, and Lindsey's younger brother. He is an avid soccer fan and can regularly be found watching his favorite player on TV. He also has a great interest in technology and computers. Smarter than his 10-year-old friends, Kevin is as precocious as he is lovable. He also has asthma, which was first seen in the 2005 film adaption. He loves to find his way around the rules and really wants to be the center of attention. Kevin is 10 in season one and turns 13 in season three.
 Teala Dunn replaces Aleisha Allen as Lindsey Kingston-Persons, Suzanne's daughter, Nick's stepdaughter, and Kevin's older sister. At 15, Lindsey is a typical teen girl, who loves spending time with her friends and is attached to her cellphone. She has a strong bond with her parents and little brother, but she would prefer to hang out with friends instead of family. Lindsey often gets in trouble and she and Kevin often blackmail each other.
 Christian Finnegan replaces Jay Mohr as Martin aka Marty, Nick's best friend who now owns a sports-themed bar/restaurant. Martin is a lovable rogue who is single and dating. Quick dialogue from an episode implies that he may have once had a relationship with Suzanne's friend Gigi. He enjoys life and his friends, and helps Nick with any problems with Suzanne.
 Keesha Sharp as Gigi, Suzanne's assistant and best girlfriend. Always ready for a good time, she frequently jets to the hottest parties in and out of town. She convinces Suzanne to not blame Nick so much.
 Telma Hopkins as Marilyn Persons (recurring, season 1;  main, seasons 2–3), Nick's mother, Suzanne's mother-in-law, and the kids' stepgrandmother. She is constantly on the go and not available for babysitting. She's not thrilled about being any kind of grandmother and she isn't crazy about her new daughter-in-law, but Nick is her only child, so she has to adjust to his new life as a husband and father.

Recurring

 Ice Cube as Terrence, Suzanne's paramilitary brother, Nick's brother-in-law, and the kids' uncle. Because he works for a Covert Government Agency, he is very secretive. He is protective of his only sister and uses every opportunity to remind Nick that he better be good to her, even by threatening to kill him. One of his running gags is when he points and says, "What's that?" and the person he's talking to will look away and will look back to see him disappear and hear the door slam. Ice Cube originally portrayed Nick in the films though he didn't reprise his role as Nick.
 Charlie Murphy replaces Sean Millington as Frank Kingston, Suzanne's ex-husband, Kevin and Lindsey's father, Terrence's former brother-in-law and Nick's rival. Frank neglected Kevin and Lindsey and is seen throughout the show trying to reconcile with the family, but Suzanne and Nick no longer trust him.
 Michael Hall D'Addario as Troy, Kevin's best friend. Troy is a huge fan of African American culture. He knows a lot for his age and is known to be very smart, although he possesses mostly street smarts. A gag of his is how he sometimes lies to his mother: Jackie, about his whereabouts, only so that he can scheme with Kevin.
 Annie Q. as Kelly, Lindsey's best friend.
 Jacqueline Mazarella as Jackie, Troy's mother.
 Sherrod Small as Malcolm, Nick's friend.
 Joe D'Onofrio as Staten Island Mike, Nick's friend.
 Darrell Hammond as Brick Street (season 3), a KAWT anchor.

Production and development
The show is loosely based on the 2005 film of the same name and its 2007 sequel, released by Revolution Studios; however, the roles of Nick Persons, Suzanne Kingston, her two children, and Nick's friend Martin were recast for the series. The only cast member from the films to appear is the show's executive producer, Ice Cube, though he appears in a recurring role as Terrence, Suzanne's brother and the kids' uncle. Although the series is appropriate for all ages, it is not as family-oriented as the films.

TBS greenlit the series in June 2009 for a 10 episode order, with the option to extend the episode order to 90 episodes. Unlike most sitcoms, the production of Are We There Yet? runs on a schedule which allows three episodes to be filmed over the course of a one-week period. The series is being distributed by Debmar-Mercury. The series was filmed at the Connecticut Film Center in Stamford.

On Wednesday, May 18, 2011, it was announced that Are We There Yet? would return for new episodes on Friday starting September 30, 2011 at 8/7c on TBS. Are We There Yet? officially ended on March 1, 2013.

References

External links
 
 Are We There Yet? TBS TV official page

2010s American black sitcoms
2010 American television series debuts
2013 American television series endings
English-language television shows
TBS (American TV channel) original programming
Live action television shows based on films
Television shows set in Seattle
Television series about families
Television series by Lionsgate Television
Television series by 20th Century Fox Television
Television series by CBS Studios
Television series created by Ali LeRoi